Central Colorado Regional Airport  is a public-use airport located  south of Buena Vista, Colorado, United States.

Although most U.S. airports use the same three-letter location identifier for the FAA, ICAO and IATA, Central Colorado Regional Airport is assigned AEJ by the FAA and KAEJ by the ICAO but has no designation from the IATA.

Facilities 

References

External links 

Airports in Colorado
Buildings and structures in Chaffee County, Colorado
Transportation in Chaffee County, Colorado
Airports established in 1964
1964 establishments in Colorado